Arctotis hirsuta (Namaqua marigold, gousblom) is a species of flowering plant that is endemic to South Africa. It occurs in the provinces of the Northern Cape and Western Cape. Most typically found on sandy slopes and flats along the coast in the region between Elandsbaai to the Agulhas Plain. During the spring flower season it can flower in large numbers.

It is an annual plant that can reach up to 450 mm in height. It is somewhat fleshy and has a branched stem. The leaves are slightly hairy, which explains the name hirsuta. They grow to 200 mm long. The flowers are orange, yellow or cream-colored and the flower heads are about 40 mm in diameter.

Gallery

References

hirsuta
Flora of South Africa
Plants described in 1915